Llanvihangel railway station was a former station which served the Monmouthshire village of Llanvihangel Crucorney.  It was located on the Welsh Marches Line between Hereford and Abergavenny.

The platforms were staggered beneath the road bridge. Station buildings were substantially constructed of stone. Llanvihangel is close to the summit of the Llanvihangel Bank as it climbs north from Abergavenny at a 1 in 82 gradient.

The station closed in 1958. The double line remains in use but the platforms have been removed.

References

Further reading

Disused railway stations in Monmouthshire
Former Great Western Railway stations
Railway stations in Great Britain closed in 1854
Railway stations in Great Britain closed in 1958